Court and Spark is the sixth studio album by Canadian singer-songwriter Joni Mitchell. Released in January 1974, it infuses the folk rock style of her previous albums with jazz elements.

It was an immediate commercial and critical success—and remains her most successful album. It reached No. 2 in the United States and No. 1 in Canada and eventually received a double platinum certification by the RIAA, the highest of Mitchell's career. It also reached the Top 20 in the UK and was voted the best album of the year for 1974 in The Village Voice Pazz & Jop Critics Poll. In 2020, it was ranked at number 110 in [[Rolling Stone's 500 Greatest Albums of All Time|''Rolling Stones 500 Greatest Albums of All Time]].

Background
Mitchell did not release a new album in 1973, the first year she had not done so in her professional career. Her previous offering, For the Roses, was released in November 1972 to critical and commercial success, and Mitchell decided to spend the whole of the next year writing and recording a new album that revealed her growing interest in new sounds—particularly jazz. During 1973 her stage appearances were fewer than in previous years. She performed in April in a benefit concert at the Sir George Williams University Auditorium and then appeared live again in August, twice at The Corral Club, accompanied by Neil Young.

Mitchell spent most of 1973 in the recording studio creating Court and Spark. Mitchell and engineer Henry Lewy called in a number of top L.A. musicians to perform on the album including members of the Crusaders, Tom Scott's L.A. Express, cameos from Robbie Robertson, David Crosby and Graham Nash and even a twist of comedy from Cheech & Chong.

Release
On December 1 Asylum Records released a single, her first in over a year, "Raised on Robbery". The single reached No. 65 on the Billboard Singles Chart in February 1974.

Reception

Released in January 1974, Court and Spark was met with widespread critical acclaim and commercial success. Its success was reaffirmed when the follow-up single, "Help Me", was released in March. It received heavy radio airplay and became Mitchell's first and only Top 10 Billboard single, peaking at No.7 on the Hot 100 in the first week of June, and reaching No. 1 on the Adult Contemporary chart.

Court and Spark became a big seller that year, peaking at No.2 on the Billboard album chart and staying there for four weeks. The album topped the US Cashbox and Record World charts for one week each.

In a July 1979 interview with Cameron Crowe for Rolling Stone, Mitchell recounted playing the newly completed Court and Spark to Bob Dylan, during which he fell asleep. She later suggested that Dylan was probably trying to be "cute" in front of label boss David Geffen, who was also present.

Fleetwood Mac singer Stevie Nicks recalled taking LSD to the album: "I was with my producer, at his house, with a set of speakers that were taller than that fireplace, and I was in a safe place. And I sat there on the floor and listened to that record… That was a pretty dynamic experience."

In 2000 it was voted number 116 in Colin Larkin's All Time Top 1000 Albums.

Honors
 RIAA certifications: gold February 27, 1974; platinum and double platinum December 12, 1997.
 In 1974, Court and Spark was voted the 'Best Album of the Year' in The Village Voice Pazz & Jop critics poll.
 It was voted number 116 in Colin Larkin's All Time Top 1000 Albums 3rd Edition (2000).
 In 2003, the album was ranked number 111 on Rolling Stone magazine's list of the 500 Greatest Albums of All Time, 114 in a 2012 revised list, and 110 in a 2020 revised list.
 In 2006, Court and Spark was included in 1001 Albums You Must Hear Before You Die.
Grammy Awards

|-
|  style="width:35px; text-align:center;" rowspan="4"|1975 ||Court and Spark || Album of the Year || 
|-
| rowspan="2"|"Help Me" || Record of the Year|| 
|-
| Best Female Pop Vocal Performance|| 
|-
| "Down to You" (arranger: Joni Mitchell and Tom Scott) || Best Arrangement Accompanying Vocalist(s)|| 
|-

Track listing
All tracks are written by Joni Mitchell, except where noted.

Side one
 "Court and Spark" – 2:46
 "Help Me" – 3:22
 "Free Man in Paris" – 3:02
 "People's Parties" – 2:15
 "The Same Situation" – 2:57

Side two
 "Car on a Hill" – 3:02
 "Down to You" – 5:38
 "Just Like This Train" – 4:24
 "Raised on Robbery" – 3:06
 "Trouble Child" – 4:00
 "Twisted" (Annie Ross, Wardell Gray) – 2:21

Personnel

 Joni Mitchell – vocals, acoustic guitar, piano; clavinet 
 Tom Scott – woodwinds, reeds
 Joe Sample – electric piano; clavinet 
 Larry Carlton – electric guitar 
 Max Bennett – bass guitar 
 John Guerin – drums, percussionAdditional personnel Chuck Findley – trumpet 
 José Feliciano – electric guitar 
 Wayne Perkins – electric guitar 
 Robbie Robertson – electric guitar 
 Dennis Budimir – electric guitar 
 Wilton Felder – bass guitar 
 Jim Hughart – bass guitar 
 Milt Holland – chimes 
 David Crosby – backing vocals 
 Graham Nash – backing vocals 
 Susan Webb – backing vocals 
 Cheech Marin, Tommy Chong – background voices Technical personnel'''
 Joni Mitchell – record producer
 Henry Lewy and Ellis Sorkin – engineers
 Anthony Hudson – art direction, design
 Joni Mitchell – cover painting
 Norman Seeff – photography

Charts and certifications

Weekly charts

Year-end charts

Certifications

References 

1974 albums
Joni Mitchell albums
Asylum Records albums
Albums recorded at A&M Studios
Albums produced by Henry Lewy
Albums produced by Joni Mitchell
Albums with cover art by Joni Mitchell